Yang Xiong (November 1953 – 12 April 2021) was a Chinese politician and business executive who served as Mayor of Shanghai, and prior to that, Chairman of Shanghai Airlines. Yang was a graduate of the Chinese Academy of Social Sciences with a master's degree in economics.

Career
Yang Xiong traced his ancestry to the Hangzhou area of Zhejiang province, but was born in Nanhui County, Jiangsu province (now part of Pudong, Shanghai). He completed a graduate degree from the Chinese Academy of Social Sciences in July 1985.  He worked in a variety of positions including chairman of Shanghai Airlines.  In February 2001 he was transferred to the municipal government of Shanghai.  In February 2003 he became a vice mayor of Shanghai and in January 2008 was promoted to executive vice mayor.  

On 26 December 2012 Yang's predecessor Han Zheng, who had been elevated to the position of Communist Party Secretary of Shanghai, resigned as mayor and Yang was appointed the acting mayor of Shanghai in place of Han. On 1 February 2013, he was elected Mayor of Shanghai by the Municipal People's Congress.

On 17 January 2017, Yang resigned as mayor. He was replaced by Ying Yong.

Unusual for an official of his rank, Yang was never a full nor alternate member of the Central Committee of the Chinese Communist Party.

Yang died surprisingly on 12 April 2021 at Huashan Hospital due to heart failure.  He was 67.

References 

1953 births
2021 deaths
Mayors of Shanghai
Chinese Communist Party politicians from Shanghai
People's Republic of China politicians from Shanghai
Chinese chief executives
Businesspeople from Shanghai
Beijing Forestry University alumni
Chinese Academy of Social Sciences alumni
20th-century Chinese businesspeople
21st-century Chinese businesspeople
Chinese aviation businesspeople